Enakku Vaaitha Adimaigal is a 2017 Indian Tamil-language comedy drama film written and directed by Mahendran Rajamani and produced by Shan Sutharsan. The film stars Jai and Pranitha, with Karunakaran, Kaali Venkat and Naveen George Thomas in supporting roles. Featuring music composed by Santhosh Dhayanidhi and cinematography by Mahesh Muthuswami, the film began production during June 2016 and was released on 2 February 2017.

Plot
The film revolves around Krishna (Jai), who works in an IT company. He has three friends: Ramesh (Karunakaran), a bank cashier; Moideen (Kaali Venkat), an auto driver; and Sowmya (Naveen George Thomas), a call center executive. Krishna goes on a vacation with his colleagues, where he falls in love with his colleague Divya (Pranitha). Everything goes fine in the initial few days, and their love life is a bliss. One day, Divya breaks up with Krishna, citing a reason that she is going to marry someone else. Krishna gets heartbroken and depressed, so he consults a psychiatrist named Muthu Vinayagam (Thambi Ramaiah) for counsel. Muthu listens to Krishna's story and advises him to get in touch with his friends whenever he feels depressed. As a result, Krishna reaches out to his three friends, who turn out to be busy with their personal lives and do not pay heed to his words. Krishna becomes dejected, rents a lodge, and gets drunk. He calls up his friends and threatens them that he is about to commit suicide. Realizing that their friend is in serious trouble, they immediately act upon to reach out to him. As they are unaware of his location, they are not able to find him. During the search process, all three of them get into various troubles for no fault of their own. Despite the troubles, will they be able to reach out to their friend and stop his suicide constitutes the rest of the story.

Cast

Production
In March 2016, Mahendran Rajamani and Vansan Movies held discussions with actors Siddharth, Nakul and Thaman about casting them in a script titled Enakku Vaaitha Adimaigal. Despite Thaman's announcement that the trio would reunite again after Boys (2003), the project failed to materialise. Soon after, Vansan Movies announced that they had instead signed on actor Jai to be a part of a film in early June 2016. Pranitha joined the team to portray the lead actress, while Karunakaran, Kaali Venkat and theatre actor Naveen were selected to portray Jai's friends. Thambi Ramaiah and Rajendran were also bought in to portray characters in the film, with the latter copying the body language of American actor Dwayne Johnson for his role. The film was officially launched on 22 June 2016, with a poster of the film released depicting the technical crew as a part of a WhatsApp group conversation. The film was shot extensively in the final quarter of 2016 across Kodaikanal and Puducherry. In December 2016, Santhanam shot for a cameo appearance in the film.

Release
The film was initially announced to be releasing on 14 January 2017, during the Pongal holidays in Tamil Nadu, but was later delayed after most screens were handed to the Vijay-starrer Bairavaa. The film was subsequently released on 2 February.

Reception
Sify.com called the film "a slow paced comedy entertainer, which evokes some laughter at a few places" stating that Mahendran Rajamani "has some sharp and funny dialogues" but "however, his direction lacks the punch and pace required for such a multi-layered film". Likewise, The New Indian Express wrote "a promising work of a debutant maker, the film could have done with more punch and fizz" adding that "the dialogue is laced with sparkling one-liners which to an extent manages to keep the narration lively". The critic from Times of India compared the film to Kappal (2014), while giving the film a mixed review.

Soundtrack

Santhosh Dhayanidhi was signed on as music composer and revealed that the director had given him a brief of producing "an anthem kind of number on friendship". Looking for a renowned singer, Santosh requested Anirudh Ravichander to sing that particular song in the film. The soundtrack also features a gaana number sung by Jagan, a YouTube find and a melody song by Haricharan and Jonita Gandhi. The audio rights of the film was acquired by Vansan Music, a subsidiary of the production house, and the complete album was released on 26 December 2016.

References

External links
 

2017 films
2010s Tamil-language films
Indian comedy-drama films
2017 comedy-drama films
Films set in Tamil Nadu
Films shot in Tamil Nadu